Studio Sonica is a Polish dubbing studio that was founded in 1993. The studio not only commissions dubbed versions of content for its clients, but also lectured versions.

Clients
Warner Bros.
20th Century Fox
DreamWorks 
Canal+ Poland
ITI Cinema
Disney Character Voices International
Minimax (now known as ZigZap)
BBC Worldwide
MiniMini

Content
Fantastic Four (2005 film)
Asterix and Obelix vs Caesar   
Astro Boy
A Bug's Life
E.T. the Extra-Terrestrial 
Good Boy!
The Polar Express
Ice Age
Ice Age: The Meltdown
Ice Age: Dawn of the Dinosaurs
Eragon
Garfield: The Movie
Star Wars: The Clone Wars
Star Wars: Episode III – Revenge of the Sith 
Cheaper by the Dozen
Horton Hears a Who!
Harry Potter and the Philosopher's Stone
Harry Potter and the Chamber of Secrets
Meet Dave
Braceface
6teen
Atomic Betty
The Spooktacular New Adventures of Casper
Battle B-Daman
The Jetsons 
Duel Masters
Cubix
Ed, Edd n Eddy
Huntik: Secrets & Seekers
Super Hero Squad Show
The Large Family
Titeuf
Supa Strikas
Ruby Gloom
The Green Squad
Lou!
Alvin and the Chipmunks
Alvin and the Chipmunks: The Squeakquel
Alvin and the Chipmunks: Chipwrecked
Winx Club (Season 4)
Monsters and Pirates (TV edition)
The Iron Giant
Rockin' with Judy Jetson
¡Mucha Lucha!
NASCAR 3D: The Imax Experience
Raa Raa the Noisy Lion
Ice Age: A Mammoth Christmas
Total Drama

Staff

Managers
Roman Szafrański
Olga Szlachcic

Directors
Miriam Aleksandrowicz
Jerzy Dominik
Magdalena Gnatowska
Piotr Kozłowski
Andrzej Mastalerz
Jacek Kopczyński
Jacek Rozenek
Piotr Zelt
Jarosław Boberek

Voice actors
Janusz Wituch
Jerzy Dominik
Miriam Aleksandrowicz
Anna Apostolakis
Tomasz Bednarek
Grzegorz Hardej
Grzegorz Drojewski
Jarosław Boberek
Jarosław Domin
Jonasz Tołopiło
Mirosława Niemczyk
Anna Sztejner
Jan Radzikowski
Elżbieta Jędrzejewska
Karina Szafrańska
Witold Wysota
Dariusz Kurzelewski
Anna Ułas
Aleksander Czyż
Modest Ruciński
Agata Buzek
Katarzyna Godlewska
Maciej Zakościelny
Anna Sroka
Jacek Bończyk
Marcin Przybylski
Brygida Turowska
Agnieszka Kunikowska
Łukasz Talik
Beata Deskur
Jan Aleksandrowicz
Michał Głowacki
Agnieszka Kudelska
Joanna Górniak
Dorota Furtak
Waldemar Barwiński
Katarzyna Łaska
Michał Maciejewski
Miłogost Reczek
Joanna Pach
Robert Kudelski
Hanna Kinder-Kiss
Klementyna Umer
Piotr Kozłowski
Katarzyna Pysiak
Monika Węgiel
Monika Ambroziak
Beata Deskur
Paweł Ciołkosz
Marta Zygadło
Magdalena Stużyńska
Karolina Dryzner
Mieczysław Morański
Jerzy Mazur
Jacek Czyż
Agata Gawrońska-Bauman
Adam Bauman
Paweł Szczesny
Sławomir Pacek
Arkadiusz Jakubik
Olga Bończyk
Beata Wyrąbkiewicz
Aleksandra Rojewska
Elżbieta Kopocińska
Krystyna Kozanecka
Joanna Jabłczyńska
Adam Pluciński
Jakub Truszczyński
Wit Apostolakis-Gluziński
Mateusz Narloch
Monika Pikuła
Robert Tondera
Krzysztof Szczerbiński
Marcin Łabno
Ewa Dałkowska
Wiesława Mazurkiewicz
Maria Peszek
Magdalena Karel
Lucyna Malec
Julia Kołakowska
Magdalena Różczka
Joanna Jędryka
Julia Malska
Edyta Jungowska
Agnieszka Fajlhauer
Katarzyna Owczarz
Kamilla Baar
Wojciech Duryasz
Aleksander Gręziak
Włodzimierz Bednarski
Przemysław Stippa
Leszek Zduń
Krzysztof Gosztyła
Marian Opania
Jan Prochyra
Kajetan Lewandowski
Kacper Kuszewski
Damian Walczak
Sergiusz Żymełka
Mateusz Maksiak
Andrzej Chudy
Artur Pontek
Iwo Fajlhauer
Tomasz Steciuk
Jan Aleksandrowicz-Krasko
Andrzej Andrzejewski
Krzysztof Banaszyk
Waldemar Barwiński
Jakub Wieczorek
Jolanta Wołłejko
Matylda Damięcka
Katarzyna Tatarak 
Sebastian Cybulski 
Stefan Knothe 
Łukasz Nowicki
Aleksander Wysocki
Jerzy Łapiński
Olga Sawicka
Karina Szafrańska
Magdalena Krylik-Gruziel
Dominika Kluźniak
Joanna Wizmur
Agnieszka Matysiak
Julia Kornacka
Justyna Bojczuk
Izabella Bukowska
Wojciech Malajkat
Marcin Perchuć
Cezary Pazura
Piotr Fronczewski
Dariusz Toczek
Ryszard Olesiński
Andrzej Zieliński
Tomasz Kot 
Jacek Sołtysiak
Janusz Zadura
Antoni Pawlicki
Maciej Falana
Michał Piela
Mariusz Kiljan 
Borys Szyc

See also 
SDI Media Group (fellow dubbing company which also has an office in Warsaw, Poland)
Start International Polska
Master Film (Poland)

External links 

Film production companies of Poland
Mass media companies established in 1993
Mass media in Warsaw
Polish dubbing studios